The Hegman Lake Pictographs are a well-preserved example of a Native American pictograph, located on North Hegman Lake in the Boundary Waters Canoe Area Wilderness in Minnesota, USA. The rock art is considered "Perhaps the most visited and photogenic pictograph within the State of Minnesota."  The rock wall overlooking the lake has a panel of images as described below.

From "Interpreting the Pictographs of North Hegman Lake", Kevin L. Callahan:
The panel shows a human figure in an outstretched arms posture standing near a quadruped animal with a long tail, possibly a dog or wolf, and a remarkably well drawn bull moose with splayed hooves and dew claws. (A dew claw on a moose is a reduced hind toe or the false rudimentary hoof above the true hoof .) Beneath these figures is a long horizontal line, probably representing the ground or horizon, and above the human figure are two vertical rows of short horizontal lines or dashes. One set has 4 lines and next to it are 3 lines. Above and to the right are what look like three canoes. The top two canoes have two paddlers and the third has a faint single one in the middle. Above the moose's rack is a single mark. Above all of these figures is a large cross like a "plus" sign.

See also
 Boundary Waters Canoe Area Wilderness

References

External links
 Interpreting the Pictographs of North Hegman Lake
 Pictures at Miami Art Exchange

Rock art in North America
Native American painting
Native American history of Minnesota
Superior National Forest
Petroglyphs in Minnesota